Pleistovultur is an extinct genus of large New World vulture from the Late Pleistocene or Early Holocene of South America. The type species P. nevesi was described based in a complete and well preserved right tibiotarsus from the Cuvieri cave deposits in Lagoa Santa region in Minas Gerais state, Brazil. It was larger than Sarcoramphus papa, but smaller than Vultur gryphus.

References 

Cathartidae
Quaternary birds of South America
Pleistocene Brazil
Fossils of Brazil
Fossil taxa described in 2008
Prehistoric bird genera